Clitheroe Royal Grammar School is a co-educational grammar school in the town of Clitheroe in Lancashire, England, formerly an all-boys school. It was founded in 1554 as "The Free Grammar School of King Philip and Queen Mary" "for the education, instruction and learning of boys and young men in grammar; to be and to continue for ever."

After forty two years of sharing the school buildings with the boys, the newly-built Girls Grammar School opened in 1957, and merged with the Boys' Grammar School in 1985. CRGS celebrated its 450th anniversary in July 2004.  At the same time, Stuart Holt retired as headteacher, having started in 1991. He was succeeded by Mrs Judith Child, who was headteacher until 2018. In September 2018, she was replaced by Mr James Keulemans, a former international rugby player.

After becoming a Grant Maintained School in September 1991, Clitheroe Royal Grammar School became a Foundation School with a Foundation under the School Standards and Framework Act 1998. Most recently, on 1 January 2011, the school converted to Academy School Status under the Academies Act 2010.

Clitheroe Royal Grammar School continues to be based on two sites, with the Sixth Form Centre occupying the historic buildings on York Street, and the Main School at the former Girls' Grammar School buildings on Chatburn Road.

Intake
The Main School intake each year is 150 children, who have each reached the required standard in the school's entrance examination, with places being offered preferentially to candidates living within the school's defined 'Catchment Area'. Pupils are then divided into five forms, named after the initials of the form tutor, and each assigned a house (C, R, G, S and T). This means the pupil population at Main School is about 750.

Sixth Form entry is based on GCSE performance and takes in around 330 students per year. The matriculation requirements are five grade Bs at GCSE, with at least a Grade C in English Language and Mathematics, while some subjects also require specific grades in related GCSE subjects.

Sixth form

The school was originally based at St Mary's churchyard, and was moved to the York Street site in 1814, in rooms that are now used to teach Art and Foreign Languages. The school was extended in 1878, and again in 1914, to include what is now the Library. In 2009, the site was extended further to create more classrooms and a conference room.

Commemoration Day
Every year the school holds a commemoration day to remember the founding of the school, on St. John the Baptist's Day in the local parish church of Mary Magdalene.

From the Statutes, dated 1622:

 We ordaine and be yt a Statute of this Schoole for ever. That from henceforth once every year upon St John Baptists day called Midsommer day in the forenoone there shalbee a Sermon preached in the Church of Clitherow where the Maister Usher and Schoolers of the said Schoole shalbee p'sent before the Governors of the said Schoole and therein shalbee a comemoracon of the foundation of the said Schoole with an exhortation to the said Governors Schoolmr and Usher that they faithfully and diligently p'forme their duties.

Or, modernised:

 Let this be a Statute of this school forever. Every year upon St John the Baptist's day (Midsummer's day) in the morning there shall be a Sermon preached in Clitheroe Church where the Master Usher and Scholars of the School shall be sent before the Governors the School and there shall be a commemoration of the foundation of the School with an exhortation to the Governors, Headteacher and Usher that they faithfully and diligently perform their duties.

Language College bid
After failing in the bid to become a Technology College, a language college committee was set up at CRGS in the autumn term of 2005, seeking to get specialist Language College status for the school. The bid was successful, and the school now receives extra funding for expansions and developments into further language areas.

As a result of the new status, taster courses in Mandarin, Urdu and Russian were being held, which were intended to be extended to the local community. This is no longer the case. The building programme has been completed, and contains four classrooms and two store rooms. In 2008, the school was awarded the Foundation International School Award in 2008 and the Full Award in 2009, recognising the outstanding work with partner schools in France, Germany, Spain and Italy.

The school no longer holds such a status, with the classification now being abandoned as of 2010.

The school runs annual exchange trips to partner schools in both Germany and France, as well as visits for music and sport, including the annual Isle of Man visit for Year 7 pupils.

School newspaper
The school newspaper, the Royal Blazer, was printed three times a year until 2006. The paper was distributed within school free of charge, and was put up for sale in the local area. Pupils were encouraged to contribute articles on subjects important to them and the local community.

Notable former pupils

 Sir William Addison (1905–1992), historian and author
 William Blezard (born 1921), composer
 Pattie Coldwell (1952-2002), television presenter and journalist
 Bryan Cowgill (1927-2008), senior BBC TV executive who devised Grandstand and Match of the Day, Controller of BBC1 from 1974 to 1977
 Martin Dobson (born 1948), footballer for Burnley and England
 Ross Eccles (born 1937), contemporary artist
 Peter Hargreaves (born 1946), co-founder of Hargreaves Lansdown
 Judith Hart, Baroness Hart of South Lanark DBE PC, (1924-1991), senior Labour Party politician, MP for Lanark and Clydesdale
 Michael Hindley (born 1947), Labour MEP from 1984 to 1994 of Lancashire East, and from 1994-9 of Lancashire South
 Captain James King (1750–1784), Royal Navy officer who saw service on Captain Cook's third voyage
 Samantha Murray (born 1989), modern pentathlon London 2012 Silver Olympic Medalist
 Norman Myers, environmentalist 
 Amanda Parker, High Sheriff of Lancashire
 Dixon Robinson (1795-1878), Lancashire Lawyer, Steward of the Honor of Clitheroe, Landowner, Limeburner, and Philanthropist, resident of Clitheroe Castle.
 Bill Slater (footballer)
 Thomas Starkie (1782-1849), lawyer and jurist
 Jon Schofield (born 1985), Kayak K2 200m London 2012 Bronze Medalist, 2016 Olympic silver medallist.
 Arthur Joseph Wrigley, (1902–1983), obstetrician and gynaecologist

See also

Listed buildings in Clitheroe
List of English and Welsh endowed schools (19th century)

References

External links

 Clitheroe Royal Grammar School - Official Website
 Ofsted - Recent Ofsted Report
League Table Results - Latest results for 2009

1554 establishments in England
Academies in Lancashire
Educational institutions established in the 1550s
Grammar schools in Lancashire

Schools in Clitheroe